Srinagar Lok Sabha constituency is one of the five Lok Sabha (parliamentary) constituencies in the Srinagar district of Jammu and Kashmir in northern India.

Previous Assembly segments
Srinagar Lok Sabha constituency is composed of the following assembly segments:
 Kangan (assembly constituency no. 16) - JKNC
 Ganderbal (assembly constituency no. 17) - JKNC
 Hazratbal (assembly constituency no. 18) - PDP
 Zadibal (assembly constituency no. 19) - PDP
 Eidgah (assembly constituency no. 20) - JKNC
 Khanyar (assembly constituency no. 21) - JKNC
 Habba Kadal (assembly constituency no. 22) - JKNC
 Amira Kadal (assembly constituency no. 23) - PDP
 Sonawar (assembly constituency no. 24) - PDP
 Batmaloo (assembly constituency no. 25) - PDP
 Chadoora (assembly constituency no. 26) - PDP
 Budgam (assembly constituency no. 27) - JKNC
 Beerwah (assembly constituency no. 28) - JKNC
 Khan Sahib (assembly constituency no. 29) - JKPDF
 Charari Sharief(assembly constituency no. 30) - PDP

New Assembly Segments

Members of Parliament

^ by poll

Election results

General elections 2019
Srinagar Lok Sabha seat had 11,06,729 total electorate count in 2009, and that count typically goes up by 35-40% over 10 years in India. Due to the security situation in the valley, there was only 13% voter turn-out in Srinagar seat in May 2019. On the other hand, Udhampur enjoyed voter turn-out of 66% because of the better law and order situation in Jammu area. In 70 polling booths of Srinagar Lok Sabha seat, not a single vote was cast due to the fear of violence.

By election 2017

General elections 2014

General elections 2009

General elections 2004

See also
 Ladakh Lok Sabha constituency

References

Lok Sabha constituencies in Jammu and Kashmir
Srinagar district
Ganderbal district
Budgam district